The Making of Maddalena is a 1916 American silent drama film directed by Frank Lloyd and written by L. V. Jefferson based upon a play by Samuel Service and Mary Service. The film stars Edna Goodrich, Forrest Stanley, Howard Davies, John Burton, Mary Mersch, and Colin Chase. The film was released on June 8, 1916, by Paramount Pictures. It is preserved in the Library of Congress collection.

Plot
The story was described in advertising as the story of a beautiful Italian model's romance with a young American.

Cast 
Edna Goodrich as Maddalena
Forrest Stanley as George Hale
Howard Davies as Angelo
John Burton as Randolph Hale
Mary Mersch as Blanche Belgrave
Colin Chase as Augustus Foster
Juan de la Cruz as Signor Benedetto Pastorelli
Laura La Varnie as Marie 
Katherine Griffith as Mrs. Wright
Mary Bunting as Mrs. Hale
Violet White 
Walter S. Fredericks

References

External links 

Progressive Silent Film List: The Making of Maddalena at silentera.com

1916 films
1910s English-language films
Silent American drama films
1916 drama films
Paramount Pictures films
Films directed by Frank Lloyd
American black-and-white films
American silent feature films
Surviving American silent films
1910s American films